The Rimrock Resort Hotel is a hotel in Banff, Alberta, Canada, on the slope of Sulphur Mountain, within Banff National Park. It has 346 rooms and 21 suites, two restaurants (Primrose and Eden), two lounges (Larkspur and Divas) and a coffee shop. U.S. News & World Report voted it the fifth best hotel in the province in 2015, and noted that it was included in the Travel + Leisure 500 World's Best Hotels for 2015.

References

External links
Official site

Hotels in Alberta
Buildings and structures in Banff, Alberta